The checkered garter snake (Thamnophis marcianus) is a species of garter snake in the subfamily Natricinae of the family Colubridae. The species is endemic to the southwestern United States, Mexico, and Central America.

Etymology
The specific epithet marcianus is in honor of American Brigadier General Randolph B. Marcy, who led surveying expeditions to the frontier areas in the mid-19th century.

Description
The checkered garter snake is typically greenish in color, with a distinct, black checkerboard pattern down its back. It is capable of growing to a total length (including tail) of 42 inches (107 cm), but is usually 18 to 24 inches (46 to 61 cm).

Habitat
The preferred habitats of T. marcianus are desert and grassland, usually close to water.

Diet
The diet of T. marcianus includes small frogs, toads, small fish, and earthworms.  If kept as a pet, it can be trained on live or freeze-thawed mice, but even so, it is a fussy eater and can suddenly start to refuse mice at any point.

Defensive behavior
T. marcianus will strike and bite if provoked. It will also release a foul-smelling liquid from its cloaca onto attackers.

Venom
T. marcianus were long thought to be nonvenomous, but recent discoveries have revealed that they do in fact produce a mild neurotoxic venom. T. marcianus cannot kill humans with the small amounts of venom they produce, which is comparatively mild, and they also lack an effective means of delivering it. They do have enlarged teeth in the back of their mouth, but their gums are significantly larger. The Duvernoy's gland of garters are posterior (to the rear) of the snake's eyes. The mild venom is spread into wounds through a chewing action.

Subspecies
Three subspecies of T. marcianus are recognized as being valid, including the nominotypical subspecies.

T. m. marcianus 
T. m. praeocularis 
T. m. bovalli 

Nota bene: A trinomial authority in parentheses indicates that the subspecies was originally described in a genus other than Thamnophis.

In captivity
The checkered garter snake is one of the easiest garter snakes to tame. Even a wild-caught one can become tame in a few days if handled carefully. The checkered garter snake is frequently available in the exotic pet trade, and makes a hardy captive animal. It can be trained to accept mice or fish fillets as food. Captive breeding, while not common, is done, and albino variants are being produced.

References

External links

http://www.thamnophis.com.
http://www.gartersnake.info.

Further reading

Baird SF, Girard CF (1853). Catalogue of North American Reptiles in the Museum of the Smithsonian Institution. Part I.—Serpents. Washington, District of Columbia: Smithsonian Institution. xvi + 172 pp. (Eutainia marciana, new species, pp. 36–37).
Behler JL, King FW (1979). The Audubon Society Field Guide to North American Reptiles and Amphibians. New York: Alfred A. Knopf, Inc. 743 pp. . (Thamnophis marcianus, p. 669 + Plate 515).
Schmidt KP, Davis DD (1941). Field Book of Snakes of the United States and Canada. New York: G.P. Putnam's Sons. 365 pp. (Thamnophis marcianus, pp. 241–243).
Smith HM, Brodie ED Jr (1982). Reptiles of North America: A Guide to Field Identification. New York: Golden Press. 240 pp. . (Thamnophis marcianus, pp. 150–151).
Stebbins RC (2003). A Field Guide to Western Reptiles and Amphibians, Third Edition. The Peterson Field Guide Series ®. Boston and New York: Houghton Mifflin Company. xiii + 533 pp. . (Thamnophis marcianus, p. 389 + Plate 50 + Map 159).
Stejneger L, Barbour T (1917). A Check List of North American Amphibians and Reptiles. Cambridge, Massachusetts: Harvard University Press. 125 pp. (Thamnophis marcianus, p. 101).
Wright AH, Wright AA (1957). Handbook of Snakes of the United States and Canada. Ithaca and London: Comstock Publishing Associates. 1,105 pp. (in two volumes). (Thamnophis marcianus, pp. 802–806, Figure 231 + Map 58 on p. 763).

Thamnophis
Extant Pliocene first appearances
Reptiles described in 1853
Taxa named by Spencer Fullerton Baird
Taxa named by Charles Frédéric Girard